The Foreign, Commonwealth & Development Office (FCDO) is a department of the Government of the United Kingdom. Equivalent to other countries' ministries of foreign affairs, it was created on 2 September 2020 through the merger of the Foreign & Commonwealth Office (FCO) and the Department for International Development (DFID). The FCO, itself created in 1968 by the merger of the Foreign Office (FO) and the Commonwealth Office, was responsible for protecting and promoting British interests worldwide.

The head of the FCDO is the Secretary of State for Foreign, Commonwealth and Development Affairs, commonly abbreviated to "Foreign Secretary". This is regarded as one of the four most prestigious positions in the Cabinet – the Great Offices of State – alongside those of Prime Minister, Chancellor of the Exchequer and Home Secretary. James Cleverly was appointed Foreign Secretary on 6 September 2022.

The FCDO is managed day-to-day by a civil servant, the permanent under-secretary of state for foreign affairs, who also acts as the Head of His Majesty's Diplomatic Service. Philip Barton took office as permanent under-secretary on 2 September 2020.

The expenditure, administration and policy of the FCDO are scrutinised by the Foreign Affairs Select Committee.

Responsibilities 
According to the FCDO website, the department's key responsibilities (as of 2020) are as follows:

 Safeguarding the UK's national security by countering terrorism and weapons proliferation, and working to reduce conflict.
 Building the UK's prosperity by increasing exports and investment, opening markets, ensuring access to resources, and promoting sustainable global growth.
 Supporting British nationals around the world through modern and efficient consular services.
In addition to the above responsibilities, the FCDO is responsible for the British Overseas Territories, which had previously been administered from 1782 to 1801 by the Home Office, from 1801 to 1854 by the War and Colonial Office, from 1854 to 1966 by the Colonial Office, from 1966 to 1968 by the Commonwealth Office, from 1968 to 2020 by the Foreign and Commonwealth Office, and since 2020 by the Foreign, Commonwealth and Development Office (this did not include protectorates, which fell under the purview of the Foreign Office, or to British India, which had been administered by the East India Company until 1858, and thereafter by the India Office). This arrangement has been subject to criticism in the UK and in the overseas territories. For example, the chief minister of Anguilla, Victor Banks, said: "We are not foreign; neither are we members of the Commonwealth, so we should have a different interface with the UK that is based on mutual respect". There have been numerous suggestions on ways to improve the relationship between the overseas territories and the UK. Suggestions have included setting up a dedicated department to handle relations with the overseas territories, and the absorption of the OTD in the Cabinet Office, thus affording the overseas territories with better connections to the centre of government.

Ministers
The FCDO Ministers are as follows:

History

Eighteenth century
The Foreign Office was formed in March 1782 by combining the Southern and Northern Departments of the Secretary of State, each of which covered both foreign and domestic affairs in their parts of the Kingdom. The two departments' foreign affairs responsibilities became the Foreign Office, whilst their domestic affairs responsibilities were assigned to the Home Office. The Home Office is technically the senior.

Nineteenth century

During the 19th century, it was not infrequent for the Foreign Office to approach The Times newspaper and ask for continental intelligence, which was often superior to that conveyed by official sources. Examples of journalists who specialized in foreign affairs and were well connected to politicians included: Henry Southern, Valentine Chirol, Harold Nicolson, and Robert Bruce Lockhart.

Twentieth century
During the First World War, the Arab Bureau was set up within the British Foreign Office as a section of the Cairo Intelligence Department. During the early cold war an important department was the Information Research Department, set up to counter Soviet propaganda and infiltration. The Foreign Office hired its first woman diplomat, Monica Milne, in 1946.

The Foreign and Commonwealth Office (1968–2020)
The FCO was formed on 17 October 1968, from the merger of the short-lived Commonwealth Office and the Foreign Office. The Commonwealth Office had been created only in 1966, by the merger of the Commonwealth Relations Office and the Colonial Office, the Commonwealth Relations Office having been formed by the merger of the Dominions Office and the India Office in 1947—with the Dominions Office having been split from the Colonial Office in 1925.

The Foreign and Commonwealth Office held responsibility for international development issues between 1970 and 1974, and again between 1979 and 1997.

The National Archives website contains a Government timeline to show the departments responsible for Foreign Affairs from 1945.

Under New Labour (1997–2010) 
From 1997, international development became the responsibility of the separate Department for International Development.

When David Miliband took over as Foreign Secretary in June 2007, he set in hand a review of the FCO's strategic priorities. One of the key messages of these discussions was the conclusion that the existing framework of ten international strategic priorities, dating from 2003, was no longer appropriate. Although the framework had been useful in helping the FCO plan its work and allocate its resources, there was agreement that it needed a new framework to drive its work forward.

The new strategic framework consists of three core elements:

 A flexible global network of staff and offices, serving the whole of the UK Government.
 Three essential services that support the British economy, British nationals abroad and managed migration for Britain. These services are delivered through UK Trade & Investment (UKTI), consular teams in Britain and overseas, and UK Visas and Immigration.
 Four policy goals:
 countering terrorism and weapons proliferation and their causes
 preventing and resolving conflict
 promoting a low-carbon, high-growth, global economy
 developing effective international institutions, in particular the United Nations and the European Union.

In August 2005, a report by management consultant group Collinson Grant was made public by Andrew Mackinlay. The report severely criticised the FCO's management structure, noting:

 The Foreign Office could be "slow to act".
 Delegation is lacking within the management structure.
 Accountability was poor.
 The FCO could feasibly cut 1200 jobs.
 At least £48 million could be saved annually.

The Foreign Office commissioned the report to highlight areas which would help it achieve its pledge to reduce spending by £87 million over three years. In response to the report being made public, the Foreign Office stated it had already implemented the report's recommendations.

In 2009, Gordon Brown created the position of Chief Scientific Adviser (CSA) to the FCO. The first science adviser was David C. Clary.

On 25 April 2010, the department apologised after The Sunday Telegraph obtained a "foolish" document calling for the upcoming September visit of Pope Benedict XVI to be marked by the launch of "Benedict-branded" condoms, the opening of an abortion clinic and the blessing of a same-sex marriage.

Coalition and Conservatives (2010–2020) 

In 2012, the Foreign Office was criticised by Gerald Steinberg of the Jerusalem-based research institute NGO Monitor, saying that the Foreign Office and the Department for International Development provided more than £500,000 in funding to Palestinian NGOs which he said "promote political attacks on Israel". In response, a spokesman for the Foreign Office said "we are very careful about who and what we fund. The objective of our funding is to support efforts to achieve a two-state solution. Funding a particular project for a limited period of time does not mean that we endorse every single action or public comment made by an NGO or by its employees."

In September 2012, the FCO and the Canadian Department of Foreign Affairs signed a Memorandum of Understanding on diplomatic cooperation, which promotes the co-location of embassies, the joint provision of consular services, and common crisis response. The project has been criticised for further diminishing the UK's influence in Europe.

In 2011, the then Foreign Secretary, William Hague, announced the government's intention to open a number of new diplomatic posts in order to enhance the UK's overseas network. As such, eight new embassies and six new consulates were opened around the world.

Foreign, Commonwealth and Development Office (2020–present) 
On 16 June 2020, Prime Minister Boris Johnson announced the merger of the FCO with the Department for International Development. This was following the decision in the February 2020 cabinet reshuffle to give cross-departmental briefs to all junior ministers in the Department for International Development and the Foreign Office. The merger, which created the Foreign, Commonwealth and Development Office, took place in September 2020 with a stated aim of ensuring that aid is spent "in line with the UK's priorities overseas". The merger was criticised by three former prime ministers – Gordon Brown, Tony Blair and David Cameron – with Cameron saying that it would mean "less respect for the UK overseas". The chief executive of Save the Children, Kevin Watkins, called it "reckless, irresponsible and a dereliction of UK leadership" that "threatens to reverse hard-won gains in child survival, nutrition and poverty".

In November 2021, it was reported that an employment tribunal had ruled that the FCDO had racially discriminated against Sonia Warner, a black senior civil servant, by treating her unfairly in a disciplinary process.

On 21 February 2022, UK Minister for Africa announced a new £74 million financial package to support women entrepreneurs across Nigeria, who own businesses and small and medium enterprises (SME’s).

In 2022, Maria Bamieh settled an employment claim against the Foreign Office for more than £400,000 shortly before her claim was due to be heard by an employment tribunal. She said that the Foreign Office failed to support her when she attempted to expose corruption at the EU’s rule of law mission (EULEX). The Foreign Office said : “We have agreed to settle this long-running case without any admission of liability and continue to strongly refute these allegations.”

Diplomatic Academy

Following a prior announcement by the then Foreign Secretary William Hague, the FCO opened the Diplomatic Academy in February 2015. The new centre, opened by the Duke of Cambridge, was established in order to create a cross-government centre of excellence for all civil servants working on international issues. The Diplomatic Academy serves to broaden the FCO's network and engaged in more collaborative work with academic and diplomatic partners.

Programme Funds
The FCDO, through its core departmental budget, funds projects which are in line with its policy priorities outlined in its Single Departmental Plan. This funding includes both Official Development Assistance (ODA), and non-ODA funds. The funds are used for a wide range of projects and serve to support traditional diplomatic activities.

The FCDO plays a key role in delivering two, major UK government funds which work to support the government's National Security Strategy and Aid Strategy.

 The Conflict, Stability and Security Fund (CSSF) – Used to support cross-governmental efforts at reducing conflict-related risks in countries which the UK has important interests.
 The Prosperity Fund – Supports economic development and reform in the UK's partner countries.
 The Global Innovation Fund - Invests in evidence-based innovations with the potential to positively impact the lives of people living on less than $5 per day. 

The FCDO also supports a number of academic funds:
 Chevening scholarships
 Marshall scholarships
 Domestic Programme Fund
 Overseas Territories Environment and Climate Fund (Darwin Plus)
 Science and Innovation Network

2021 aid budget cuts 
In 2021, the UK government cut its overseas aid budget from 0.7% to 0.5% of Gross National Income despite UK legislation against such a move. These cuts, amounting to GBP 4 billion, reduced funding for humanitarian intervention by 44% in places like Yemen and Syria. It also cut funding for the fight against polio, malaria and HIV/AIDS. Funding for girls education worldwide was also reduced by 25%.

Investments
The Global Innovation Fund (GIF) announced the first two investments made under its ‘Innovating for Climate Resilience fund’, which was launched at COP26 with support from the UK's Foreign Commonwealth and Development Office (FCDO) and in partnership with the Adaptation Research Alliance and the Global Resilience Partnership.

FCDO Services 
In April 2006, a new executive agency was established, FCO Services (now FCDO Services), to provide corporate service functions. It moved to Trading Fund status in April 2008, so that it had the ability to provide services similar to those it already offers to the FCDO to other government departments and even to outside businesses.

It is accountable to the secretary of state for foreign, Commonwealth and development affairs, and provides secure support services to the FCDO, other government departments and foreign governments and bodies with which the UK has close links.

Since 2011, FCDO Services has been developing the Government Secure Application Environment (GSAE) on a secure cloud computing platform to support UK government organisations. It also manages the UK National Authority for Counter Eavesdropping (UK NACE) which helps protect UK assets from physical, electronic and cyber attack.

FCDO Services is a public sector organisation, it is not funded by the public and has to rely on the income it produces to meet its costs, by providing services on a commercial basis to customers both in the UK and throughout the world. Its accounting officer and chief executive is accountable to the secretary of state for foreign, Commonwealth and development affairs and to Parliament, for the organisation's performance and conduct.

Global Response Office 
The FCDO Global Response Office is based in an undisclosed location. It operates 24/7, every day of the year. It takes calls from British Nationals overseas, usually in emergency situations such as lost passports, hospitalisations, deaths and arrests.

Buildings

As well as embassies abroad, the FCDO has premises within the UK:
 Foreign and Commonwealth Office Main Building, Whitehall, King Charles St, London (abbreviated to KCS by FCDO staff)
Abercrombie House, East Kilbride (abbreviated to AH by FCDO staff)
Hanslope Park, Hanslope, Milton Keynes (abbreviated to HSP by FCDO staff). Location of FCDO Services, HMGCC and Technical Security Department of the UK Secret Intelligence Service)
 Lancaster House, St James's, London. A mansion in the St James's district in the West End of London which the Foreign Office holds on lease from the Crown. It is used primarily for hospitality, entertaining foreign dignitaries and housing the Government Wine Cellar.

The FCO formerly also used the following building:
 Old Admiralty Building (abbreviated to OAB), Whitehall, London

Main Building

The Foreign, Commonwealth and Development Office occupies a building which originally provided premises for four separate government departments: the Foreign Office, the India Office, the Colonial Office, and the Home Office. Construction on the building began in 1861 and finished in 1868, on the plot of land bounded by Whitehall, King Charles Street, Horse Guards Road and Downing Street. The building was designed by the architect George Gilbert Scott. Its architecture is in the Italianate style; Scott had initially envisaged a Gothic design, but Lord Palmerston, then prime minister, insisted on a classical style. The English sculptors Henry Hugh Armstead and John Birnie Philip produced a number of allegorical figures ("Art", "Law", "Commerce", etc.) for the exterior.

In 1925 the Foreign Office played host to the signing of the Locarno Treaties, aimed at reducing tension in Europe. The ceremony took place in a suite of rooms that had been designed for banqueting, which subsequently became known as the Locarno Suite. During the Second World War, the Locarno Suite's fine furnishings were removed or covered up, and it became home to a Foreign Office code-breaking department.

Due to increasing numbers of staff, the offices became increasingly cramped and much of the fine Victorian interior was covered over—especially after the Second World War. In the 1960s, demolition was proposed, as part of major redevelopment plan for the area drawn up by the architect Leslie Martin. A subsequent public outcry prevented these proposals from ever being implemented. Instead, the Foreign Office became a Grade I listed building in 1970. In 1978, the Home Office moved to a new building, easing overcrowding.

With a new sense of the building's historical value, it underwent a 17-year, £100 million restoration process, completed in 1997. The Locarno Suite, used as offices and storage since the Second World War, was fully restored for use in international conferences. The building is now open to the public each year over Open House Weekend.

In 2014 refurbishment to accommodate all Foreign and Commonwealth Office employees into one building was started by Mace.

Devolution
International relations are handled centrally from Whitehall on behalf of the whole of the United Kingdom and its dependencies. However, the devolved administrations also maintain an overseas presence in the European Union, the U.S. and China alongside British diplomatic missions. These offices aim to promote their own economies and ensure that devolved interests are taken into account in British foreign policy. Ministers from devolved administrations can attend international negotiations when agreed with the British Government e.g. EU fisheries negotiations.

See also

 Conflict, Stability and Security Fund
 Foreign and Commonwealth Office migrated archives
 Palmerston (cat), resident Chief Mouser of the Foreign and Commonwealth Office
 Stabilisation Unit
 List of development aid agencies

References

Further reading

External links

 
 
 
 

 
Foreign relations of the United Kingdom
Ministerial departments of the Government of the United Kingdom
United Kingdom
Italianate architecture in England
Grade I listed government buildings
Grade I listed buildings in the City of Westminster
Ministries established in 1968
George Gilbert Scott buildings
1968 establishments in the United Kingdom
Foreign Office during World War II
Whitehall